Kazimierz Szosland (21 February 1891, Grzymaczew, Kalisz Governorate – 20 April 1944) was a Polish horse rider, major of the Polish Army, who competed in the 1924 Summer Olympics and in the 1928 Summer Olympics.

He fought in the wars with Ukraine and Soviet Russia and was killed in action during World War II.

In 1924 he finished 23rd in the individual three-day event and placed seventh in the team three-day event. In the individual jumping competition he finished 32nd. The Polish team finished in sixth position. Four years later he won the silver medal with the Polish team in the team jumping with his horse Ali after finishing thirteenth in the individual jumping.

References

External links
 profile 
 dataOlympics profile

1891 births
1944 deaths
Equestrians at the 1924 Summer Olympics
Equestrians at the 1928 Summer Olympics
Olympic equestrians of Poland
Olympic silver medalists for Poland
Olympic medalists in equestrian
People from Sieradz County
People from Kalisz Governorate
Polish male equestrians
Polish military personnel
Polish people of the Polish–Soviet War
Polish people of the Polish–Ukrainian War
Sportspeople from Łódź Voivodeship
Medalists at the 1928 Summer Olympics
Polish military personnel killed in World War II